Howard Andrew Williams (December 3, 1927 – September 25, 2012) was an American singer. He recorded 43 albums in his career, of which 15 have been gold certified and three platinum certified. He was also nominated for six Grammy Awards. He hosted The Andy Williams Show, a television variety show, from 1962 to 1971, along with numerous TV specials. The Andy Williams Show won three Emmy Awards. He sold more than 45 million records worldwide, including more than 10 million certified units in the United States.

Williams was active in the music industry for over 70 years until his death in September 2012 from bladder cancer, at the age of 84.

Early life and education
Williams was born in Wall Lake, Iowa, to Florence (née Finley) and Jay Emerson Williams, who worked in insurance and the post office. While living in Cheviot, Ohio, Williams attended Western Hills High School in Cincinnati, Ohio. He finished high school at University High School, in West Los Angeles, because of his family's move to California. At 17, Williams joined the United States Merchant Marine and served until the end of World War II.

Career

1938–1952: Early career
Williams had three older brothers—Bob, Don, and Dick Williams. His first performance was in a children's choir at the local Presbyterian church.  His brothers and he formed the Williams Brothers quartet in late 1938, and they performed on radio in the Midwest, first at WHO in Des Moines, Iowa, and later at WLS in Chicago, and WLW in Cincinnati.

Moving to Los Angeles in 1943, the Williams Brothers sang with Bing Crosby on his 1944 hit record "Swinging on a Star". They appeared in four musical films: Janie (1944), Kansas City Kitty (1944), Something in the Wind (1947), and Ladies' Man (1947).

A persistent myth alleges that as a teenager, the future singing star dubbed the singing for Lauren Bacall's character in the 1944 feature film To Have and Have Not. According to authoritative sources, including Howard Hawks and Bacall herself, this was not true. Williams and some female singers were tested to dub for Bacall because of fears that she lacked the necessary vocal skills, but those fears were overshadowed by the desire to have Bacall do her own singing despite her imperfect vocal talent.

The Williams Brothers were signed by Metro-Goldwyn-Mayer (MGM) to appear in Anchors Aweigh and Ziegfeld Follies (1945), but before they went before the cameras the oldest brother, Bob, was drafted into military service and the group's contract was cancelled. Kay Thompson, a former radio star who was now head of the vocal department at MGM, had a nose for talent and hired the remaining three Williams brothers to sing in her large choir on many soundtracks for MGM films, including The Harvey Girls (1946). When Bob completed his military service, Kay hired all four brothers to sing on the soundtrack to Good News (1947).

By then, Thompson was tired of working behind the scenes at MGM, so with the four Williams boys as her backup singers and dancers, she formed a nightclub act, Kay Thompson and the Williams Brothers. They made their debut in Las Vegas in 1947 and became an overnight sensation. Within a year, they were the highest-paid nightclub act in the world, breaking records wherever they appeared.

Williams revealed in his memoir Moon River and Me that  Thompson and he  became romantically involved while on tour despite the age difference (he was 19 and she was 38). The act broke up in 1949, but reunited for another hugely successful tour from the fall of 1951 through the summer of 1953. After that, the four brothers went their separate ways. A complete itinerary of both tours is listed on the Kay Thompson biography website.

Williams and Thompson, however, remained very close, both personally and professionally. She mentored his emergence as a solo singing star. She coached him, wrote his arrangements, and composed many songs that he recorded, including his 1958 top-20 hit "Promise Me, Love", and later, "Kay Thompson's Jingle Bells" on his 1964 number-one The Andy Williams Christmas Album. Using her contacts in the business, Thompson helped Williams land his breakthrough television gig as a featured singer for two and a half years on Tonight Starring Steve Allen; it helped that the producer of the series, Bill Harbach, was Kay's former aide-de-camp. Thompson also got Williams his breakthrough recording contract with Cadence Records, whose owner, Archie Bleyer, had gotten early career breaks because of Kay and owed her a favor. Meanwhile, Williams sang backup on many of Thompson's recordings through the 1950s, including her top-40 hit "Eloise", based on her bestselling books about the mischievous little girl who lives at the Plaza Hotel in New York.

Thompson also served as a creative consultant and vocal arranger on Williams's three summer-replacement network television series in 1957, 1958, and 1959. In the summer of 1961, Thompson traveled with Williams and coached him throughout his starring role in a summer stock tour of the musical Pal Joey. Their personal and professional relationship finally ended in 1962, after Williams met and married Claudine Longet, and Thompson moved to Rome.

1953–1961: Cadence years
Williams's solo career began in 1953. He recorded six sides for RCA Victor's label "X", but none was a popular hit.

After landing a spot as a regular on the Tonight Starring Steve Allen in 1954, Williams was signed to a recording contract with Cadence Records, a small label in New York, run by conductor Archie Bleyer. Williams's third single, "Canadian Sunset", reached number seven in the top 10 in August 1956; it was followed in February 1957 by his only Billboard number-one hit, "Butterfly", a cover of a Charlie Gracie record. "Butterfly" was also number one for two weeks on the UK Singles Chart in May 1957. More hit records followed, including "Hawaiian Wedding Song" (US number 11), "Are You Sincere?" (US number three in February 1958), "The Village of St. Bernadette" (US number seven in December 1959), "Lonely Street" (US number five in September 1959), and "I Like Your Kind of Love" with Peggy Powers (US number eight in May 1957).

1962–1980: The Columbia years

On December 15, 1961, Williams married Claudine Longet and signed with Columbia Records. His first album with Columbia, Danny Boy and Other Songs I Love to Sing, was a chart success, peaking at number 19. He was then asked to sing "Moon River", the theme from Breakfast at Tiffany's, at the 1962 Academy Awards, where it won Best Original Song. Archie Bleyer at Cadence had previously told Williams that "Moon River" would not be a hit, but the Columbia producers encouraged Andy to record the song along with 11 other movie themes for an album. After Williams performed the song at the awards show, it became a hit. Moon River and Other Great Movie Themes then sold across the country, garnering critical acclaim and propelling Williams into stardom. The album remained on the charts for the next three years and peaked at number three. In 1963, Williams's producer, Robert Mersey, encouraged him to record "Can't Get Used to Losing You" as the B-side to "Days of Wine and Roses". Williams initially did not like the pop song, preferring the Mancini tune, but "Can't Get Used to Losing You" reached number two in the US and UK. The album containing both songs, Days of Wine and Roses and Other TV Requests, topped the album charts at number one for 16 weeks.

From 1962 to 1972, Williams was one of the most popular vocalists in the country, and was signed to what was at that time the biggest recording contract in history. He was primarily an album artist, and at one time, he had recorded more gold albums than any solo performer except Frank Sinatra, Johnny Mathis, and Elvis Presley. By 1973, he had earned as many as 17 gold-album awards. Among his hit albums from this period were The Andy Williams Christmas Album, Dear Heart, The Shadow of Your Smile, Love, Andy, Happy Heart, Get Together with Andy Williams, Love Story, and Love Theme from the Godfather. These recordings, along with his natural affinity for the music of the 1960s and early 1970s, combined to make him one of the premier easy-listening singers of that era.

In the UK, Williams continued to reach high chart status until 1978. The albums Dear Heart (1965), Love Andy (1967), Can't Help Falling in Love (1970), Andy Williams Show (1970), Home Lovin' Man (number one, 1971), Solitaire (1973), The Way We Were (1974), and Reflections (1978) all reached the top 10.

Williams forged an indirect collaborative relationship with Henry Mancini, although they never recorded together. Both "Moon River" and "Days of Wine and Roses" were written by Mancini, with lyrics by Johnny Mercer. Williams sang Mancini's "Dear Heart" at the 1965 Academy Awards and "The Sweetheart Tree" (also written with Mercer) at the 1966 Awards.

On August 5, 1966, the 14-story, 700-room Caesars Palace casino and nightclub opened in Las Vegas, Nevada, with the stage production of "Rome Swings", in which Williams starred. He performed to a sold-out crowd in the Circus Maximus showroom. He headlined for Caesars for the next 20 years.

On September 17, 1968, Columbia released a single of two songs Williams sang at the funeral of his close friend Robert F. Kennedy: "The Battle Hymn of the Republic" and Franz Schubert's "Ave Maria". These were never released on a long-playing record, but have appeared in several compilations of Williams's output.

Williams also competed in the teen-oriented singles market and had several charting hits, including "Can't Get Used to Losing You", "Happy Heart", and "Where Do I Begin", the theme song from the 1970 blockbuster film Love Story. In addition, Williams hit the top 10 of the UK Singles Chart with "Almost There" (1964), "Can't Help Falling in Love" (1970), "Home Lovin' Man" (1970), and "Solitaire" (1973).

Williams and Petula Clark recorded "Happy Heart" around the same time, just before his guest appearance on her second NBC-TV special. Unaware that she was releasing the song as a single, he asked to perform it on the show. The exposure ultimately led to his having the bigger hit with the song. The song "Happy Heart" was used for the final scene and end credits of Danny Boyle's award-winning directorial debut film Shallow Grave (1994).

1962–1971: The Andy Williams Show

Building on his experience with Allen and some short-term variety shows in the 1950s, he became the star of his own weekly television variety show in the fall of 1962. Though cancelled after 1963 owing to low ratings, the show was then sponsored to make 12 weekly specials in the 1963–64 season. This series, The Andy Williams Show, won three Emmy Awards for outstanding variety program. Among his series regulars were the Osmond Brothers. He gave up the variety show in 1971 while it was still popular, continuing with three specials per year. His Christmas specials, which appeared regularly until 1974 and intermittently from 1982 into the 1990s, were among the most popular of the genre. Williams recorded eight Christmas albums over the years, and was known as "Mr. Christmas", due to his perennial Christmas specials and the success of "It's the Most Wonderful Time of the Year".

Williams hosted the most Grammy telecasts—seven consecutive shows—from the 13th Annual Grammy Awards in 1971 through to the 19th Awards in 1977. He returned to television with a syndicated half-hour series in 1976–77.

In the early 1970s, when the Nixon administration attempted to deport John Lennon, Williams was an outspoken defender of the former Beatle's right to stay in the United States. Williams is included in the montage of caricatures on the cover of Ringo Starr's 1973 album, Ringo.

Williams performed during the halftime show of Super Bowl VII in January 1973, held at Los Angeles Memorial Coliseum.

1991–2012: At Moon River Theatre
In June 1991, Williams' brother Don invited him to the small Ozarks town of Branson, Missouri. Don Williams at the time was the manager for entertainer Ray Stevens, who had just opened a theater in Branson. While attending Stevens' show, Williams was encouraged by numerous Branson guests to open a venue in the town. This led Williams to build his own theater in Branson in time for the 1992 season, eventually opening on May 1, 1992, as the Moon River Theatre. The name came from his signature song. It went on to become the first theater ever to be featured in Architectural Digest, and also won the 1992 Conservation Award from the State of Missouri.

The theater was designed to blend with the rough terrain of the Ozark Mountains. He had originally planned a marble style theater reminiscent of the Dorothy Chandler Pavilion in Los Angeles, but soon had a change of mind. The Larson Company of Tucson, Arizona, fabricated a section of rock on Missouri's Highway 76 and the theater was soon engulfed with waterfalls, koi-filled ponds, ferns and trees native to the Ozarks. The inside of the theater incorporates the outside. Trees and plants are seen throughout the theater's three lobbies. Oak floors are accompanied by African ribbon-striped mahogany walls that are filled with pictures of the Andy Williams Show. Williams' passion for art can be seen throughout as well. From the start of his career, Williams had accumulated several paintings and sculptures and decided to fill his theater with his collection. Frankenthaler, Diebenkorn, Oldenburg, Pollock, Klee, and Moore are a small list of artists whose work is on display at the Moon River Theatre.

The theater's auditorium can accommodate 2,054 people. The seats and carpets match Williams' Navajo rug collection and are forest green, magenta, gold, and blue. On display inside the auditorium are 19 Japanese kimonos. The stage has accommodated numerous shows and guest celebrities. On stage, Williams was joined by Glen Campbell, Ann-Margret, Petula Clark, and Charo.

When it first opened, it was unique because his was the first noncountry act to open in the then mostly country-music town. Other noncountry entertainers, such as Bobby Vinton, Tony Orlando, Wayne Newton, and the Osmond Brothers soon followed.

Williams and his theater were featured on three episodes of the soap opera As the World Turns in July 2007, when several characters went to Branson for a concert of "Gwen Munson" held in the Moon River Theatre. The Simpsons featured Williams at his Moon River Theatre in an episode titled "Bart on the Road". Nelson Muntz is an Andy Williams fan, and in the episode, he forces the gang to make a detour to Branson so he could see his idol. He is reduced to tears as Williams performs "Moon River" during the second encore.

In 2007, Williams opened the Moon River Grill adjacent to his theater in Branson. The restaurant is decorated in photos from the Andy Williams Show with stars including Diana Ross, Elton John, and Sammy Davis Jr. Art is center stage in the restaurant, with works by several artists including Andy Warhol and Robert Indiana.

In 1995, We Need a Little Christmas became Williams's 18th gold album.

His 1967 recording of "Music to Watch Girls By" became a big UK hit to a new young television audience in 1999, when it reached number 9 after being featured in new television advertisements for the Fiat Punto—and later for Diet Pepsi—beating the original peak of number 33 in 1967. A new generation was reminded of Williams' recordings and a sell-out UK tour followed the success of the single, prompting a British revival for Williams.  In 2002, he re-recorded "Can't Take My Eyes Off You" as a duet with British actress and singer Denise van Outen; it reached number 23 in the UK singles charts. He completed a sold-out tour of the United Kingdom and Asia in the winter and summer of 2007, in which he performed at several major concert halls including Royal Albert Hall, singing, among other classics, Van Morrison's "Have I Told You Lately".

Williams returned to the UK singles charts with his 1963 recording of "It's the Most Wonderful Time of the Year" in December 2007, thanks to an advertisement for Marks & Spencer, reaching number 21 in its first appearance in the British charts, also reaching number 108 on the EU top 200. In 2008, he lip-synched the 45-year-old recording to welcome Santa at the end of the Macy's Thanksgiving Day Parade.

On October 3, 2009, Williams appeared live on the BBC's Strictly Come Dancing in London, singing "Moon River" to promote the UK edition of The Very Best of Andy Williams LP, which peaked at number 10 in the main pop chart.

Business ventures
In 1964, Williams ultimately became the owner of the Cadence master tapes, which he occasionally licensed to Columbia, including not only his own recordings but also those of his fellow Cadence-era labelmates: the Everly Brothers, Lenny Welch, the Chordettes, and Johnny Tillotson. In 1968, although he was still under contract with Columbia for his own recordings, Williams formed a separate company called Barnaby Records to handle reissuing of the Cadence material, especially that of the Everly Brothers (one of the first Barnaby LPs was a double LP set of the Brothers' long out-of-print Cadence hits) and new artists. Barnaby also had several top-40 hits in the 1970s with novelty artist Ray Stevens (who had done a summer replacement show for Williams in 1970), including number-one hits such as "Everything Is Beautiful" in 1970 and "The Streak" in 1974. Also in 1970, Barnaby signed and released the first album by an unknown singer-songwriter named Jimmy Buffett (Down to Earth) produced by Travis Turk.

Columbia was initially the distributor for Barnaby, but later distribution was handled first by MGM Records and then General Recorded Tape. Once Barnaby ceased operating as a working record company at the end of the 1970s, Williams licensed the old Cadence material to various other labels (such as Varèse Sarabande and Rhino in the U.S.) after 1980.

Politics
Williams was close friends with Robert F. Kennedy and his wife, Ethel Kennedy, and campaigned for Kennedy in the 1968 Democratic presidential primary races.  Williams was among the celebrities who were in Kennedy's entourage in the Ambassador Hotel in Los Angeles when Kennedy was shot and mortally wounded by Sirhan Sirhan in June 1968. Williams sang "Battle Hymn of the Republic" at RFK's funeral, at Ethel's request. In August 1969, Williams and Claudine Longet named their newborn son, Bobby, after Kennedy. The Williams' friendship with Ethel Kennedy endured, with Williams serving as escort to Ethel at events in the 1970s. He also raised funds for George McGovern's 1972 presidential campaign, performing at benefit concerts.

Williams later said that despite his friendship with the Democratic Kennedys, he was a lifelong Republican. In 2009, he was quoted by The Daily Telegraph as accusing President Barack Obama of "following Marxist theory" and "wanting the country to fail". Williams gave Rush Limbaugh permission to use his recording of the song "Born Free" as the theme to the "Animal Rights Update" on Limbaugh's radio show—in which a portion of the song was then followed by gunfire—saying "Hey, it's fine with me. I love what you're doing with it." The record company later blocked Limbaugh's use of the recording.  Williams was a guest on the Glenn Beck Radio Program in December 2009, introduced by his own 1960s recording of "Little Altar Boy".

Personal life

Williams met French-born Claudine Longet in Las Vegas when her car broke down and he offered help. She was a dancer at the time at the Folies Bergère. They married on December 15, 1961, and over the next eight years, they had three children—Noelle, Christian (died 2019), and Robert.
After separating in 1970, Williams and Longet divorced in 1975, but they remained friends.
In March 1976, Longet was charged with fatally shooting her boyfriend, alpine ski racer Spider Sabich, in Aspen. Williams played a public role in the subsequent events, escorting her to and from the courtroom, testifying to her character at the trial, and providing legal assistance. Longet claimed the shooting was accidental, and eventually served 30 days in jail.

Williams also had partial ownership of the Phoenix Suns NBA team from the team's inception in 1968 until 1987.

On May 3, 1991, Williams married Debbie Haas, née Meyer, whom he met through a mutual friend. They made their homes at Branson, Missouri, and La Quinta, California, where he was known as the "honorary mayor". Williams was a noted collector of modern art and his homes have been featured in Architectural Digest.

Williams' birthplace in Iowa is a tourist attraction and is open most of the year.

Hobbies
Williams was an avid golfer and hosted a PGA Tour golf tournament in San Diego from 1968 to 1988 at Torrey Pines. Then known as the "Andy Williams San Diego Open", the tournament continues as the Farmers Insurance Open, usually played in February. He was also a competent ice skater, and occasionally skated as part of his television Christmas shows.

Williams was a noted art collector whose collection had hung in his homes, his offices, and in the Moon River Theatre, and was exhibited at the Saint Louis Art Museum in 1997 and 1998. After his death, his collection was split among several auction houses. His paintings went to Christie's New York, where they fetched over $50 million. His folk art collection was sold at Skinner for $2,471,725. His collection of Navajo blankets was sold by Sotheby's on May 21, 2013, yielding $978,506 (£642,064).

Illness and death

In a surprise appearance at his theater in November 2011, Williams announced that he had been diagnosed with bladder cancer. After chemotherapy treatment in Houston, he and his wife moved to a rented home in Malibu, California, to be closer to cancer specialists in the Los Angeles area.

On September 25, 2012, Williams died of bladder cancer at the age of 84 at his home in Branson, Missouri. Williams was cremated and his ashes were sprinkled into the artificial waterway named Moon River at his theater in Branson. The memorial service for Williams was held a month later.

Awards and achievements
The Andy Williams Show won three Emmy Awards in 1963, 1966, and 1967 for Outstanding Variety Series.

Andy Williams also earned six Grammy nominations:

Other honors include:
Society of Singers Lifetime Achievement Award, 2008
Star on the Hollywood Walk of Fame

Discography

Andy Williams' extensive discography began with the release of the 1948 single "Jubilee" as a member of the Williams Brothers alongside Kay Thompson. He recorded his first solo album, Andy Williams Sings Steve Allen, eight years later, and remained active in the music industry for the next 56 years, completing 43 studio albums, alongside compilation albums and more.

Studio albums 

 Andy Williams Sings Steve Allen (1956)
 Andy Williams Sings Rodgers and Hammerstein (1958)
 Two Time Winners (1959)
 To You Sweetheart, Aloha (1959)
 Lonely Street (1959)
 The Village of St. Bernadette (1960)
 Under Paris Skies (1960)
 Danny Boy and Other Songs I Love to Sing (1962)
 Moon River and Other Great Movie Themes (1962)
 Million Seller Songs (1962)
 Warm and Willing (1962)
 Days of Wine and Roses and Other TV Requests (1963)
 The Andy Williams Christmas Album (1963)
 The Wonderful World of Andy Williams (1964)
 The Academy Award-Winning "Call Me Irresponsible" and Other Hit Songs from the Movies (1964)
 The Great Songs from "My Fair Lady" and Other Broadway Hits (1964)
 Andy Williams' Dear Heart (1965)
 Merry Christmas (1965)
 The Shadow of Your Smile (1966)
 In the Arms of Love (1966)
 Born Free (1967)
 Love, Andy (1967)
 Honey (1968)
 Happy Heart (1969)
 Get Together with Andy Williams (1969)
 Raindrops Keep Fallin' on My Head (1970)
 The Andy Williams Show (1970)
 Love Story (1971)
 You've Got a Friend (1971)
 Love Theme from "The Godfather" (1972)
 Alone Again (Naturally) (1972)
 Solitaire (1973)
 The Way We Were (1974)
 Christmas Present (1974)
 You Lay So Easy on My Mind (1974)
 The Other Side of Me (1975)
 Andy (1976)
 Let's Love While We Can (1980)
 Greatest Love Classics (1984)
 Close Enough for Love (1986)
 I Still Believe in Santa Claus (1990)
 Nashville (1991)
 We Need a Little Christmas (1995)
 I Don't Remember Ever Growing Up (2007)

Filmography
1944: Janie 
1944: Kansas City Kitty 
1947: Ladies' Man 
1947: Something in the Wind 
1960: The Man in the Moon 
1964: I'd Rather Be Rich 
1980: The Muppet Show, special guest star
1999: Dorival Caymmi (documentary)
2009: Sebring (documentary)

References
Notes

Sources
BBC Radio Nottingham Interview

External links

 
 Profile at Andy Williams Theatre
 

1927 births
2012 deaths
20th-century American male singers
20th-century American singers
American art collectors
American crooners
American male pop singers
American military personnel of World War II
American Presbyterians
American sailors
American television hosts
Apex Records artists
Cadence Records artists
Columbia Records artists
Deaths from bladder cancer
Deaths from cancer in Missouri
Iowa Republicans
London Records artists
Military personnel from Iowa
Missouri Republicans
Musicians from Cincinnati
Ohio Republicans
People from Branson, Missouri
People from Cheviot, Ohio
People from La Quinta, California
People from Sac County, Iowa
Phoenix Suns owners
Polydor Records artists
Singers from Iowa
Traditional pop music singers
United States Merchant Mariners
United States Merchant Mariners of World War II
X Records artists
United Service Organizations entertainers